Ramil Kamilevich Aritkulov (born 1 March 1978) is a Russian middle distance runner who specializes in the 800 metres.

He participated at the 2002 European Championships, the 2004 Summer Olympics, the 2006 World Indoor Championships and the 2006 European Championships. He finished fifth in 1500 m at the 2006 IAAF World Cup and won a silver medal in 800 m at the 2003 Summer Universiade.

Artikulov is an ethnic Tatar. He was born in Kerki.

Personal bests
800 metres - 1:45.28 min (2004)
1500 metres - 3:40.54 min (2006)

References
 

1978 births
Living people
Russian male middle-distance runners
Athletes (track and field) at the 2004 Summer Olympics
Olympic athletes of Russia
Universiade medalists in athletics (track and field)
Tatar people of Russia
Universiade silver medalists for Russia
Medalists at the 2003 Summer Universiade
People from Lebap Region